Hans Sleeswijk (January 31, 1935, Amsterdam) is a sailor from the Netherlands, who represented his country at the 1960 Summer Olympics in Naples in the Finn. Sleeswijk took the 24th place. In the previous Olympics in Melbourne Sleeswijk was the spare sailor for the Dutch Olympic team. However, after the Soviet invasion in Hungary the Dutch government decided that the Dutch Olympic team would not compete.

Sources
 
 
 
 
 
 
 
 
 
 

Living people
1935 births
Dutch male sailors (sport)
Sportspeople from Amsterdam
Sailors at the 1960 Summer Olympics – Finn
Olympic sailors of the Netherlands
20th-century Dutch people